Poste Vaticane is an organization responsible for postal service in Vatican City. The organization is part of the Post and Telegraphy Service.

History 

The use of stamps was introduced in the Vatican in 1852.

Poste Vaticane was created in 1929 following the Lateran Treaty. It started operations on 1 August 1929 (or February 1929). Its yellow mail boxes became iconic in the landscape of the papal city. The Poste Vaticane also handled the state's telegraph communications. The air courier system was set up in 1938. The Poste Vaticane joined the European Conference of Postal and Telecommunications Administrations in 1965, and PostEurop in 2012.

In 2020, a law was passed to merge the philatelic and postal activities of the Poste Vaticane. In September 2020, the Poste Vaticane released a stamp picturing the coronavirus.

Description 

Poste Vaticane manages the Philatelic and Numismatic Office of the Vatican City State and operates four branch offices. The Poste Vaticane handles 140 tonnes of mail and six million postcards every year.

In popular culture 
In the 1991 movie Hudson Hawk, Bruce Willis and Andie MacDowell walk through a fictional Vatican secret railway platform branded Poste Vaticane.

See also
Postage stamps and postal history of Vatican City

References

External links

Communications in Vatican City
Vatican City
Vatican City